Festival of International Virtual & Augmented Reality Stories (FIVARS) is a media festival that showcases stories or narrative forms from around the world using immersive technology that includes virtual reality, augmented reality, live VR performance theater and dance, projection mapping and spatialized audio. It is considered to be Canada's first dedicated virtual or augmented reality stories festival, and was the world's first virtual reality festival dedicated completely and exclusively to narrative pieces. FIVARS is operated by Constant Change Media Group, Inc. and VRTO (Virtual Reality, Toronto - a conference and Meetup group).

2015 - History 
Created, directed and curated by Keram Malicki-Sanchez and working with technical director Joseph Ellsworth, in Toronto, Ontario, Canada in the summer of 2015, the FIVARS - an acronym for the Festival of International Virtual & Augmented Reality Stories - featured a selection of virtual reality and augmented reality experiences that focus on narrative or a form of storytelling. The earliest recorded event was the Camp Wavelength music festival in Toronto, August 28-30th. FIVARS then ran its first official festival September 20 and 21 at rock music venue "UG3 Live" in downtown Toronto from 11am to 7pm.

FIVARS returned with a preview pavilion at the VRTO Virtual & Augmented Reality World Conference & Expo in June 2016 and to Camp Wavelength in August of the same year.

2016 Year 2, MSMU 
The festival continued in 2016 for a second year, September 16–18, 11am to 7pm at MSMU Studios, an abandoned furniture warehouse in west side of downtown Toronto. The program was listed a "Public Event You Should Attend" in the syllabus for the Future Cinema program at York University. The festival featured 30 selections - each enhanced by a haptic backpack created by Subpac FIVARS Festival Explores Human Experience Through Virtual Reality, in addition to a custom 3D Audio Chamber created by David McKevy and an augmented reality art gallery by artist Daniel Leighton and presentation by Joergen Geerds of KonceptVR and Daniel Burwen of Jaunt XR. Ellsworth moved into a tech consulting position.

2017 - House of VR, and Jesus 
In 2017, the FIVARS festival featured 35 pieces from 15 countries and was held at the House of VR in Toronto. World premieres included "Sanctuary" by Shivani Melukar, "City of Ghosts" from director Olivier Asselin and CieAR, and IN HIS PRESENCE from director Brenda Colonna and producer Philip Plough, among others. In 2019 the piece was covered again in an article The New Yorker about Virtual Reality for beginners penned by Patricia Marx, in which Malicki-Sanchez was interviewed and quoted.

2018 and the Resurrection of Historic Site: The Matador 
The 2018 took place at the legendary Matador Ballroom - a famous after-hours club and public hall about which Leonard Cohen wrote the song "Closing Time" in 1992. The ballroom was reopened for one weekend, the host the FIVARS festival. The festival showcased 36 new pieces from 12 countries. In this third year, Malicki-Sanchez was joined by associate producer Stephanie Greenall.

2019 - 5 Years, the Toronto Media Arts Centre 
For its 5th anniversary, the FIVARS festival moved to the Toronto Media Arts Centre in Toronto and expanded to six galleries, showcasing 31 new selections from 10 countries, including Germany, France, China, Netherlands, USA, UK, and Canada. The panels featured talks by Ed Callway of AMD, Thomas Wallner from Liquid Cinema VR Inc, director Brett Leonard (The Lawnmower Man (film)), Nimrod Shanit and Timur Musabay (The Holy City VR) and international sculptor and installation artist Marilene Oliver, among others. Malicki-Sanchez was again joined by co-producer and co-curator Stephanie Greenall.

2020 - FIVARS and Spatialized.Events 
The 2020 COVID-19 pandemic forced most festivals to become virtual events on the internet, and FIVARS turned to lead JanusWeb JanusWeb developer James Baicoianu to help build an online theater for the festival. Malicki-Sanchez and Baicoianu developed a user interface using WebXR, and powered by Amazon Web Services to deliver ultra high definition stereoscopic spherical video in the web browser that had no buffering delay. Baicoianu tweaked the transcoding settings higher than the maximum that Amazon typically allowed. FIVARS build upon a financial grant awarded through the Canadian Film Centre's incubator to develop their online virtual events. Malicki-Sanchez hosted FIVARS under the same umbrella - Spatialized.Events - as the VRTO 2020 conference. Ultimately they ended up developing the foundations for a new social, 3D platform for the web, featuring many accessibility features as well. These various elements were outlined at length in a Medium article penned by Malicki-Sanchez, and a 2-hour interview with Kent Bye on the Voices of VR podcast.

The 6th edition of the festival featured here are 39 official selections from 16 countries — including Australia, Brazil, Canada, Finland, France, Germany, Korea, New Zealand, Poland, Qatar, Spain, and Sweden — chosen from among the more than 200 entries, including a documentary about a restored ship once owned by John Steinbeck, and the world premiere of a new single released by ambient music composer Steve Roach, created by Audri Phillips.

The event was again produced by Malicki-Sanchez and Stephanie Greenall and featured 28 360 video pieces and 10 Virtual Reality and Augmented Reality pieces.

2021 - FIVARS in FEB  - Pushing the Limits of Web3D 
In 2021 the festival launched a new event for the start of the year, now running against Sundance Festival, Tribeca Film Festival and SXSW. With the other festivals now also virtual, the playing field was levelled. FIVARS expanded the virtual event to include a variety of themed artistic 3D environments, continuing development on the JanusWeb engine while also incorporating the HighFidelity audio engine launched by Second Life creator Philip Rosedale.

The environments were designed by Malicki-Sanchez, and the backend work was further developed by Baicoianu and featured projection-mapped domes, and a 3-screen immersive theater with 5.1 audio. The immersive theater featured a 24-minute hard rock concept album by music artist Militia Vox. The dome featured visual effects productions by Audri Phillips and Virtuality.

Among the selections in the catalog was a stereoscopic spherical documentary by Gary Yost and award-winning film director Adam Loften titled "Inside COVID19" that follows Dr. Josiah Child, battling on the front lines as the novel coronavirus spreads. Another featured selection was a 360-degree music video for the song "Rukh" written recorded by Malicki-Sanchez and Don Garbutt, featuring Alex Lifeson on guitar, and visually produced by Audri Phillips. Among the interactive works was a piece produced by Elizabeth Leister, professor of immersive media at Cal Arts titled "All Her Bodies" featuring the stories of trauma and resilience by six different woman in a volumetric design produced with Depthkit and Unity software. The festival featured a live discussion with Leister on International Women's Day.

The FIVARS in FEB show presented only people's choice awards and grouped all other juried categories together with the fall event, now titled FIVARS in FALL.

2021 - FIVARS in FALL (Hybrid, Los Angeles) 
In the autumn of 2021 the FIVARS festival became a hybrid event with an in-person showcase event at an art gallery space in West Hollywood from October 15 to 17, California and then followed by an online WebXR event that ran for two weeks spanning October 22 to November 2.

The festival put stringent protocols to handle the COVID 19 virus outbreak including using medical-grade sanitization boxes created by Cleanbox technologies and requiring a negative CoVID test or proof of vaccination. The event would feature works from Ecuador, Israel, Taiwan, US, Canada, and other countries.

FIVARS was nominated Event of the Year by the 2nd annual Poly Awards.

2022 - FIVARS in FEB (Hybrid: Toronto, Los Angeles) 

FIVARS in FEB saw the festival iterate on its Web3D platform, showcasing an even higher resolution of spherical video at 5.7k in the browser. The event also operated pop-ups for in-person attendees to view the interactive content at Two-Bit Circus (a virtual reality arcade operated by Brent Bushnell, son of Atari and Chuck E. Cheese founder Nolan Bushnell in Los Angeles, and Dark Slope in Toronto simultaneously.

2022 - FIVARS in FALL 2022 (Hybrid: Toronto, Los Angeles) 10th Festival 

FIVARS in FALL 2022 saw the festival continue to improve its 360 video transcode pipeline, switching to a new encoding method to improve playback across different devices. The event also operated pop-ups for in-person attendees to view the interactive content at Stackt in Toronto - a co-op artist compound and marketplace made entirely out of shipping containers. The 10th showcase for the festival featured a world premiere by Jacquelyn Ford Morie called "When Pixels Were Precious" operating in VRChat as a form of guided tour in Virtual Reality looking at her early digital graphics work in the 1980s. Additionally, the festival showcased a three-part opera "Antigone's Gone" in 360 degrees filmed in India, Indonesia, North Africa and the Middle East, and new works from Wales, Japan, USA, Australia, Canada, UK, Netherlands, France, Germany, and Israel. 

The festival also debuted new virtual reality theater works: "Offrail", in addition to "MetaMovie: Alien Rescue," and "We Should Meet in Air" - a telephonic immersive experience reenacting a live conversation with author Sylvia Plath.

Immersive Media Awards 
The festival awards prizes for People's Choice in two categories: Immersive Video and Interactive Experience and introduced a Grand Jury prize and Impact award in 2017. In 2019 the festival added additional awards for Best Experience Design, Best Visual Design, Best Audio Design.

2015 

On Monday, September 21 the festival announced People's Choice awards for two categories at the Cadillac Lounge - a music venue and restaurant in Toronto.

PEOPLE’S CHOICE:
 Best Interactive Experience: Apollo 11 
 Best Immersive Video: SONAR

2016 

PEOPLE’S CHOICE:
 Best Interactive Experience: Pearl (Patrick Osborne)
 Best Immersive Video: Help (Justin Lin)

JURIED:
Grand Jury Award: Real (Connor Hair and Alex Meader)

2017 

PEOPLE’S CHOICE:
 Best Interactive: Alteration
 Best Immersive (Passive): Guardian of the Guge Kingdom

JURIED:
 Impact Award: Priya's Shakti / Priya's Mirror (Dan Goldman)
 Grand Jury Prize: Manifest 99

2018 

PEOPLE’S CHOICE:
 Best Interactive: Museum of Symmetry (Paloma Dawkins)
 Best Immersive (Passive): Going Home (David Beier)

JURIED:
 Impact Award: The Hidden (Annie Lukowski, BJ Schwartz)
 Grand Jury Prize: Battlescar (Nico Casavecchia, Martin Allais)

2019 

PEOPLE’S CHOICE:
 Best Interactive: After Dan Graham (David Han/Friend Generator)
 Best Immersive (Passive): 2nd Step (Joerg Courtial)

JURIED:
 Technical Achievement: tx-reverse
 Excellence in Experience Design: Battlescar (Nico Casavecchia, Martin Allais) 
 Excellence in Sound Design: Unheard (Zhechuan Zhang)
 Excellence in Visual Design: Ex Anima (Pierre Zandrowicz)
 Impact Award: State Power (Jeff Stanzler)
 Grand Jury Prize: The Industry (Mirka Duijn)

2020 

PEOPLE’S CHOICE:
 Best Interactive: Gravity VR (Fabito Rychter, Amir Admoni)
 Best Immersive (Passive): Warsaw Rising (Tomasz Dobosz)

JURIED:
 Technical Achievement: The Cosmic Laughter of Cucci Binaca (Jonathan Sims)
 Excellence in Experience Design: Sleeping Eyes (Sojung Bahng, Sungeun Lee)
 Excellence in Sound Design: Symphony of Noise VR (Michaela Pnacekova)
 Excellence in Visual Design: Hominidae (Brian Andrews)
 Impact Award: Indirect Actions (Maranatha Hay)
 Grand Jury Prize: Minimum Mass (Raqi Syed, Areito Echevarria)

FIVARS in FEB 2021 

PEOPLE’S CHOICE:
 Best Interactive: CLAWS (Created by Evan Neiden & Directed by John Ertman)
 Best Immersive (Passive): Inside COVID 19 - (Gary Yost, Adam Loften)

FIVARS in FALL 2021 

PEOPLE’S CHOICE:
 Best Interactive: Samsara (Director: Hsin-Chien Huang)
 Best Immersive (Passive): The Invasion of Normandy Omaha Beach (Director: Uli Futschik)

JURIED:
 Technical Achievement: Dark Threads (Director: Jonathon Corbiere)
 Excellence in Experience Design: Andy's World (Director: Liquan Liu)
 Excellence in Sound Design: Symphony (Director: Igor Cortadellas)
 Excellence in Visual Design: Mind VR Exploration (Director: Deng Zuyun)
 Outstanding Performance: Lori Kovachevich, Lena's Journey (Director: Wes Evans)
 Impact Award: Om Devi: Sheroes Revolution (Director: Claudio Casale)
 Grand Jury Prize: Montegelato (Director: Davide Rapp)

References

Virtual reality organizations
Digital media
Film festivals in Toronto
Augmented reality
Film festivals in Los Angeles